National Bike Month is a celebration of cycling held every May in the United States.  It is sponsored by the League of American Bicyclists and celebrated in communities from coast-to-coast. Established in 1956, National Bike Month is a chance to showcase the many benefits of bicycling and to encourage more folks to giving bicycling a try.

As part of National Bike Month, National Bike to Work Week is usually held the third week of May, with Bike to Work Day being on that Friday.

See also
 Bike-to-Work Day

References 

 
 
 
 
 
 
 
 

May observances
Month-long observances